The Crane Building, also known as C.E. Erickson Co., in Des Moines, Iowa, United States. Crane Company was a plumbing and heating supplier and manufacturer that had this six-story manufacturing facility built in 1916.  It was designed by the Des Moines architectural firm of Sawyer and Watrous.  It is a utilitarian structure that is significant for its "thoughtful design" that utilizes elements of the Chicago School and a refined style. It was listed on the National Register of Historic Places in 2001. In 2013, the vacant building was renovated into 36 lofts targeted at artisans and costing 8 million dollars.

References

Commercial buildings completed in 1916
Buildings and structures in Des Moines, Iowa
National Register of Historic Places in Des Moines, Iowa
Industrial buildings and structures on the National Register of Historic Places in Iowa
Chicago school architecture in Iowa